Henriette Johanna Cornelia Maria Barones van Lynden-Leijten (9 October 1950, Gilze en Rijen – 5 November 2010, Sint Oedenrode) was a Dutch diplomat.

Baroness Van Lynden-Leijten was Dutch ambassador to Bulgaria from 2001 to 2005 and ambassador to the Vatican from 2009 to 2010. She died of cancer in 2010, aged 60.

References

1950 births
2010 deaths
Dutch women diplomats
Dutch women ambassadors
Ambassadors of the Netherlands to Bulgaria
Ambassadors of the Netherlands to the Holy See
Baronesses of the Netherlands
Deaths from cancer in the Netherlands
People from Gilze en Rijen